Sigvard Andersen (18 August 1893 – 31 March 1975) was a Norwegian diver. He was born in Bergen, and competed for the club BSC 1908. He participated at the 1912 Summer Olympics in Stockholm, in both platform and plain high. He also competed at the 1920 Summer Olympics in Antwerp.

References

External links

1893 births
1975 deaths
Sportspeople from Bergen
Divers at the 1912 Summer Olympics
Divers at the 1920 Summer Olympics
Olympic divers of Norway
Norwegian male divers